

Ethan B. Allen Elementary School 
Ethan B. Allen Elementary School is a highly rated, public school located in FOUNTAIN VALLEY, CA. It has 625 students in grades K-6 with a student-teacher ratio of 26 to 1. According to state test scores, 91% of students are at least proficient in math and 91% in reading. Ethan B. Allen Elementary School is in the top 359 best schools in California. With a grade of A in academics, A+ in teachers, and B+ in diversity. Overall, it is a good school for Southern Californians.